Robert Frederick William Robertson Nelson (1888–1932) was Unionist Party (Scotland) MP for Motherwell (UK Parliament constituency).

He was elected in 1918 as a supporter of David Lloyd George's coalition government.  He stood down in 1922.

References

External links 
 

Members of the Parliament of the United Kingdom for Scottish constituencies
1888 births
1932 deaths
UK MPs 1918–1922
Unionist Party (Scotland) MPs